Erysimum franciscanum, commonly known as the Franciscan wallflower or San Francisco wallflower, is a plant endemic to the northern California coast, from Sonoma to Santa Cruz Counties. It is a member of the genus Erysimum in the mustard family, the Brassicaceae.

The plant is a biennial or short-lived perennial. The flowers are cream-colored to yellow, with four sepals and four petals arranged in a cross shape, as is characteristic of the Brassicaceae. It flowers from late winter to late spring. The plant prefers open scrubby areas with a fair amount of sunlight, but can flourish on a range of soils including disintegrating serpentine, gravelly and sandy soils. It is fairly easily cultivated in gardens.

Although not formally recognized as endangered, the Franciscan wallflower has a limited, discontinuous distribution. It is monitored at the Presidio of San Francisco, which was also its type locality. The plant is propagated in a nursery there and then planted in its native habitat.

References

External links

Jepson Manual treatment for Erysimum franciscanum
USDA Plants Profile: Erysimum franciscanum
Erysimum franciscanum - U.C. Photo gallery

franciscanum
Endemic flora of California
Natural history of the California Coast Ranges